Sir John Hope Simpson  OBJ (23 July 1868 – 10 April 1961) was a British Liberal politician who served as a Member of Parliament in the United Kingdom and later in the Government of the Dominion of Newfoundland.

Hope Simpson was born in West Derby, son of John Hope Simpson of Sefton Park, Liverpool and Margaret Swan. He was christened "John Hope" and educated at Liverpool College and Balliol College, Oxford.

Civil service
Hope Simpson was in the Indian Civil Service between 1897 and 1916. He held numerous governmental posts, having been acting chief commander of the Andaman and Nicobar Islands. He was Private Secretary to the Ministry of Labour in 1917.

Politics
Hope Simpson ran as Liberal candidate and was elected at the 1922 general election becoming Member of Parliament (MP) for the previously Conservative-held constituency of Taunton in Somerset. He was re-elected in 1923 general election, but was defeated at the 1924 general election. He did not stand for Parliament again.

On Zionism he was persuaded that Arab population was "economically powerless against such a strong movement" and thus needed protection. Charles Anderson writes that Hope Simpson was also "wary of the gulf between Zionist rhetoric and practice, observing that 'The most lofty sentiments are ventilated in public meetings and in Zionist propaganda' but that the Jewish National Fund and other organs of the movement did not uphold or embody a vision of cooperation or mutual benefit with the Arabs".

Later career
In 1925, Hope Simpson was knighted. Following his parliamentary defeat he assumed a number of posts for various organisations, including the League of Nations, as an expert on the question of refugees. He was posted first to Greece to monitor the 1923 population exchange between Greece and Turkey. 

Following the widespread 1929 Palestine riots he was sent to British Mandate Palestine on a fact finding mission, which resulted in the Hope Simpson Report in 1930. 

During the 1931 China floods the League of Nations sent Hope Simpson to China, where he became director-general of the National Flood Relief Commission for the government of the Republic of China. As well as coordinating refugee relief, he became a strong critic of the Japanese aerial bombing of a flood refugee camp in Shanghai, following the January 28 Incident. 

Coming out of retirement at 66 years of age, Sir John became the Commissioner of Natural Resources and Acting-Commissioner of Justice for The Commission of Government of Newfoundland from 1934 until 1936.
 
Port Hope Simpson was named after him in response to the most significant backing  he had given to John Osborn Williams, the owner of the Labrador Development Company Limited, who set up a loggers' camp in Alexis Bay for cutting and exporting pitwood to Cardiff for the collieries of South Wales. 
Hope Simpson also established the Newfoundland Ranger Force a welfare and police force meant to link the people of Newfoundland and Labrador with The Commission of Government in St. John's.

In 1937 Sir John received the Knights Commander of the Order of the British Empire medal not so very long after his return from Newfoundland. In 1938 and 1939 he produced reports for Chatham House on Europe's refugee problem. He continued to be involved in the Jewish/Palestine Question after World War II. He contributed to the Report to General-Assembly, in 1947, for the United Nations Special Committee on Palestine.

Sir John Hope Simpson died on 10 April 1961. He left £29,764 16s to an unknown heir.

See also
 Hope Simpson Royal Commission
 
 Newfoundland and Labrador Heritage

Bibliography
John Hope Simpson, Refugees: preliminary report of a survey, Institute of International Affairs, 1938
John Hope Simpson, The Refugee Problem, Institute of International Affairs, October 1939

References

Notes
 .
 
 Newfoundland and Labrador Heritage

External links 
 

1868 births
1961 deaths
Companions of the Order of the Indian Empire
Knights Commander of the Order of the British Empire
Liberal Party (UK) MPs for English constituencies
UK MPs 1922–1923
UK MPs 1923–1924
Members of the Newfoundland Commission of Government
Alumni of Balliol College, Oxford
People educated at Liverpool College
Indian Civil Service (British India) officers